The Cinema Express Best Film Award is given as a part of its annual Cinema Express Awards for Tamil  (Kollywood) films.

Winners

References

Awards for best film
Cinema Express Awards
Indian Express Limited